Talmay is a commune in the Côte-d'Or department in eastern France.

Population

Personalities
 Marie-Thérèse Figueur (1774-1861) - a French heroine who fought in the French Revolutionary Wars and Napoleonic Wars. Known by her nom de guerre Madame Sans-Gêne.

See also
Communes of the Côte-d'Or department

References

Communes of Côte-d'Or